Strobilanthes integrifolius is a species of plant in the family Acanthaceae. Commonly known as Thottukurinji, it is found in the Western Ghats in the South Indian regions of Kerala, Goa, Maharashtra and Karnataka.

Description
The stems are terete and glabrous and the leaves are opposite. It bears blue to light violet flowers.

References

External links
 
 

integrifolius